

Events
The Genyosha (Dark Ocean Society), an ultra-nationalist political organization is established by members of the Yakuza.
The Vigilance Committee is organized as a reform movement to fight crime and corruption in New Orleans. 
July 5 – Months after his arrival in New Orleans from Sicily, Black Hand leader Giuseppe Esposito is quickly arrested by Police Chief David C. Hennessy and his cousin Detective Mike Hennessy. Esposito, wanted by Italian authorities on a number of murder and kidnapping charges, is soon deported to Italy. Esposito's organization is brought under control of Charles and Antonio Matranga.
July 16 – New Orleans hoodlum Anthony Labrusio (or Labruzzo) is killed by Black Hand assassin Giutano Ardota on behalf of Sicilian fugitive Giuseppe Esposito, on whom Labrusio has been informing.

Arts and literature

Births
James M. Ragen, co-founder of the Ragen's Colts street gang and Chicago gangster.
Harvey Van Dine, a co-leader of the Car Barn Bandits

Deaths
July – Anthony Labrusio, (New Orleans) Black Hand member

References

Years in organized crime
Organized crime